Fanny Blankers-Koen Stadion is a multi-use stadium in Hengelo, Netherlands. It is currently used mostly for athletics meets, especially the annual Fanny Blankers-Koen Games. It holds 15,200 people and is named after the Dutch athlete, Fanny Blankers-Koen.  The stadium was originally known as Stadion Veldwijk, but changed to its current name in 1981.

References

External links
  FBK Games website
 Stadium information

Athletics (track and field) venues in the Netherlands
Sports venues in Overijssel
Sport in Hengelo